This is a list of museums, galleries, and related building structures in Pakistan.

Museums and galleries

Archaeological and historical museums
 Harappa Museum, Harappa                                                                  
 Bahawalpur Museum, Bahawalpur                                                                                                               
 Bannu Museum, Bannu
 Chitral Museum
 City Museum, Gorkhatri, Peshawar
 Dir Museum, Chakdara                                                                                                                         
 Hund Museum, Swabi                                                                                                                               
 Kasur Museum, Kasur                                                                                                                              
 Kalasha Dur Museum, Chitral
 Lahore Museum, Lahore                                                                                                                   
 Lok Virsa Museum, Islamabad
 Lyallpur Museum, Faisalabad
 Mardan Museum, Mardan
 Multan Museum, Multan
 National Museum of Pakistan, Karachi
 National Museum of Science and Technology, Lahore 
 National History Museum, Greater Iqbal Park, Lahore                                                                                                             
 PAF Museum, Karachi
 Pakistan Maritime Museum, Karachi
 Pakistan Museum of Natural History, Islamabad
 Peshawar Museum, Peshawar
 Pushkalavati Museum, Charsadda
 Rohtas Fort Museum, Jhelum                                                                                                                       
 Archaeological Museum Banbhore
 Archaeological Museum Umerkot
 Sindh Museum, Hyderabad
 Sindhology, Jamshoro
 Swat Museum, Mingora
 Taxila Museum, Taxila                                                                                                                       
 Wazir Mansion, Karachi
 National History Museum, Lahore
 Abbott Museum, Abbottabad
 Umar Hayat Mahal Museum, Chiniot   
 Badshahi mosque Museum, Lahore  
 Gujrat Museum, Gujrat   
 Lahore fort Museum, Lahore     
 Mohanjodaro Museum, Larkana
 Thatta Museum, Sindh    
 Montgomery Museum, COMSATS Institute of Information Technology, Sahiwal
 Sahibzada Abdul Qayyum Museum, University of Peshawar, Peshawar

Archives
 Sindh Archives Karachi
 National Archives of Pakistan, Islamabad
 Supreme Court of Pakistan Archives, Islamabad

Art galleries
 Abasin Arts Council, Peshawar                                                                                                                       
 Alhamra Arts Council, Lahore
 Faisalabad Arts Council, Faisalabad
 Fakir Khana, Lahore
 Mohatta Palace, Karachi
 Multan Arts Council, Multan
 National Art Gallery, Islamabad
 Pakistan Arts Council, Karachi
 Rawalpindi Arts Council, Rawalpindi
 Vogue Art Gallery, Lahore
 Oyster Art Gallery, Lahore
 Anarkali tomb Museum, Lahore    
 Gujranwala Arts Council, Gujranwala
 Chwkandi Art Gallery Karachi

Biographical museums
 Javed Manzil (Allama Iqbal Museum), Lahore
 Iqbal Manzil, Sialkot
 Wazir Mansion, Karachi
 Mazar-e-Quaid Museum, Karachi
 Quaid-e-Azam House Museum (Flag Staff House), Karachi

Heritage museums
 Lok Virsa Museum, Islamabad
 Shakir Ali Museum, Lahore
 Chughtai Museum, Lahore

Judicial museums
 Lahore High Court Museum
 Supreme Court Museum, Islamabad

Military museums
 PAF Museum, Karachi
 Army Museum Lahore, Lahore
 Pakistan Army Museum, Rawalpindi
 Pakistan Maritime Museum, Karachi
 Sindh Police Museum, Karachi
 Punjab police Museum, Lahore

Money museums
 State Bank of Pakistan Museum & Art Gallery, Karachi

Natural history museums
 Pakistan Museum of Natural History, Islamabad
 Quetta Geological Museum, Quetta
 Natural History Museum, Karachi Zoo, Karachi

Science and technology museums 
 MagnifiScience Centre, Karachi
 National Museum of Science and Technology, Lahore

Transport museums
 Pakistan Railways Heritage Museum, near Islamabad

See also
 List of libraries in Pakistan

External links
 Museums in Pakistan by 

Pakistan
Lists of buildings and structures in Pakistan
Pakistan education-related lists
Museums in Pakistan
Lists of tourist attractions in Pakistan
Education in Pakistan
Pakistan